Lowie may refer to:
Jules Lowie (1913–1960), Belgian racing cyclist
Robert Lowie (1883–1957), Austrian-born American anthropologist
Wander Lowie (born 1959), Dutch linguist